is a Japan-exclusive video game that was released in 1986 for the Family Computer. The game was developed and published by Kemco, which was then known as Kotobuki System.

Plot
The plot revolves around a robotic revolt led by a robot named De Gaulle in the year 2199 AD. By the explosions of global nuclear war, society has broken up into nine small expulsions, one of them disappeared and Venus collided with another celestial object. Humanity only slightly survived. Its thread of life barely connected to a body; which was rebuilt into a cyborg. The heroine is named Al Tiana and is also apparently a robot who does not support the rebellion. She is out to prove her loyalty to the humans.

References

External links

1986 video games
Action video games
Japan-exclusive video games
Kemco games
Nintendo Entertainment System games
Nintendo Entertainment System-only games
Science fiction video games
Single-player video games
Video games developed in Japan
Video games featuring female protagonists